Yarmolenko is a Ukrainian surname. Its Belarusian equivalent is Yarmolenka/Jarmolienka. Notable people with the surname include:

 Andriy Yarmolenko (born 1989), Ukrainian footballer
 Artem Yarmolenko (born 1998), Ukrainian footballer
 Volha Yarmolenka (born 1976), Belarusian singer

See also
 
 Yermolenko

Ukrainian-language surnames